Sara Andrés Barrio (born 21 August 1986) is a Spanish Paralympic athlete who competes in sprinting and long jump events at international track and field competitions, she competed at the 2016 and 2020 Summer Paralympics. She is a double World bronze medalist and a European silver medalist in sprinting. Andrés lost both of her lower legs in a car accident in 2011, she was an amateur karateka and tennis player before her accident.

Andrés has written a children's book, published in 2019 titled "Sabes quien soy?" translated "Do you know who I am?" is a 36-page illustrated book of five characters that have different hobbies and impairments, the book explains how the characters live their day-to-day lives and breaking stereotypes. She also works a primary school teacher in Villanueva de la Canada, she took a leave of absence in 2019 to prepare and train for the 2020 Summer Paralympics.

References

1986 births
Living people
Athletes from Madrid
Spanish women children's writers
Spanish female sprinters
Spanish female long jumpers
Paralympic athletes of Spain
Athletes (track and field) at the 2016 Summer Paralympics
Athletes (track and field) at the 2020 Summer Paralympics
Medalists at the World Para Athletics Championships
Medalists at the World Para Athletics European Championships
21st-century Spanish women